Zong Zijie (born 20 February 1996) is a Chinese actor based in Singapore. He starred in While We Are Young in 2017.

Personal life
Zong was born in China and moved to Singapore. He studied in Bedok View Secondary School.

Career
In 2009, 13-year-old Zong made his television debut in a local television series My School Daze. Since then, the Singapore-based Chinese actor has been cast in a number of television productions including Star Awards 2016 top-rated series Tiger Mum.

In 2014, Zong joined Dasmond Koh's company, Noontalk Media, to support his career.

Zong was nominated for the Star Awards for Best Newcomer in 2018 for his work in While We Are Young where he played the lead role.

Filmography

Chinese-language series

English-language series

Awards and nominations

References

1996 births
Living people
Male actors from Fujian
Chinese male television actors
21st-century Chinese male actors
Chinese emigrants to Singapore